Dame Hilary Anne Chapman,  (born 16 August 1963) is a British former Chief Nurse at Sheffield Teaching Hospitals NHS Foundation Trust and Honorary Professor at Sheffield Hallam University. She was appointed as Lord Lieutenant of South Yorkshire on 5 November 2021.

Biography
Chapman has spent her entire career in nursing. She began and ended her main NHS career in Sheffield, retiring in 2018 as Chief Nurse at Sheffield Teaching Hospitals NHS Foundation Trust. From 2020 she works as an independent professional consultant.

She co-led the development of the Safer Nursing Care Tool, which is now used widely in hospitals across the UK. She is an Honorary Professor at Sheffield Hallam University, an Honorary Doctor of Medicine at Sheffield University, a Fellow of the Royal College of Nursing and has served on the National Institute for Healthcare Research Advisory Board.

Chapman was appointed a Deputy Lieutenant of South Yorkshire in 2016, and will succeed as Lord Lieutenant in November 2021.

She was appointed a Commander of the Order of the British Empire (CBE), and in the 2018 New Year Honours she was promoted to a Dame Commander of the Order (DBE), for services to nursing.

Chapman lives near Barnsley with her husband Neil Chapman.

References

Lord-Lieutenants of South Yorkshire
Vice-Lieutenants of South Yorkshire
People from Barnsley
1960s births
Living people
Fellows of the Royal College of Nursing
British nurses